The Martyn Brothers House, also known as the Red Cottage, is a building in Rostov-on-Don, located at the intersection of Bolshaya Sadovaya Street and Fortress Lane. The building was built by architect  in 1893, in the centre of the former Fortress of Saint Dimitry of Rostov. The first owner of the building was a British citizen, Ivan Romanovich Martyn. The Martyn Brothers' House has the status of an object of an object of cultural heritage of federal significance. The building currently houses the Sholokhov Centre, part of the National Sholokhov Museum-Reserve, and functions as an exhibition space and a venue for cultural and educational projects.

History 
The two-storey red brick house was built in 1893 to the design of Rostov architect .  The house was built in the spirit of  eclecticism, combining elements of Russian and German architecture. A pointed tower with a bay window stands on the corner of the house.  The building was originally owned by a British citizen Ivan Romanovich Martyn, then by his wife, P. I. Martyn.  The house then passed to their sons – Vasiliy, George, and Ivan.  The Martyn family owned the foundry and mechanical plant "John Martyn and Co.", located near the house. 

In the 1910s, George Martyn was Consul of the United States, and had his reception room in the building. In the 1920s, the building was nationalized.  On the ground floor were various institutions, and on the upper floor were communal apartments.  After the Great Patriotic War, the building was renovated, during which time the roof windows were lost.  In the 1980-1990s the building was occupied by the House of Artists, and housed a salon-shop, an exhibition-vernissage and an antique stall.

In 2007, the building was transferred to the National Sholokhov Museum-Reserve, and restoration works began. Repairs lasted between 2008 and 2014, with the building opening as the Sholokhov Centre on 22 May 2015, marking the 110th anniversary of Mikhail Sholokhov's birth, and Russia's Year of Literature. The centre provides exhibition space and a venue for cultural and educational projects. It hosts lectures, museum classes, creative meetings, and theme nights. Its first exhibition was "Traces of Cossack Antiquity", displaying artefacts from the Hermitage Museum's collections.

References 

Houses completed in 1893
Tourist attractions in Rostov-on-Don
Buildings and structures in Rostov-on-Don
Cultural heritage monuments in Rostov-on-Don
Gothic Revival architecture in Russia
Museums in Rostov Oblast
Cultural heritage monuments of federal significance in Rostov Oblast